Figure 2 Ranch Airport  is a private airport located 24 miles north of Van Horn, Culberson County, Texas, USA. It is located on the Figure 2 Ranch formerly owned by James M. West Sr. and his descendants who installed the airport.

External links

Airports in Texas
Culberson County, Texas